David Frank Kustoff (born October 8, 1966) is an American politician and attorney serving as the United States representative from . The district includes the bulk of West Tennessee, but most of its population is in the eastern part of the Memphis area, including the eastern fourth of Memphis itself. From 2006 to 2008, Kustoff served as a United States Attorney for the Western District of Tennessee. He is one of two Jewish Republicans in Congress, alongside Max Miller.

Early life, education, and career

David Frank Kustoff was born in Memphis on October 8, 1966, and raised in the Memphis area. He graduated from Memphis's White Station High School in 1985. Kustoff attended the University of Memphis, graduating Omicron Delta Kappa and with a bachelor's degree in business administration in 1989. He then attended the Cecil C. Humphreys School of Law, graduating in 1992.

In 1998, Kustoff opened a law firm with Jim Strickland, whom he met at the University of Memphis. Both became active in Tennessee politics; Strickland was elected mayor of Memphis in 2015.

Political career

Kustoff became active in politics during the 1990s, when he chaired the Republican Party of Shelby County. He served as George W. Bush's campaign chair in Tennessee during the 2000 and 2004 presidential elections. On August 8, 2002, Kustoff was named campaign chair for Lamar Alexander's 2002 Senate campaign. In December 2002, he criticized Senate Minority Leader Trent Lott after Lott praised Strom Thurmond for the harm that it would do to Republican outreach to minorities.

In 2002, Representative Ed Bryant announced that he would not seek reelection in Tennessee's 7th congressional district, which at the time included Kustoff's home in eastern Memphis, and would instead run for Senate. On April 3, Kustoff announced that he would seek the Republican nomination to succeed Bryant. He lost the Republican primary to State Senator Marsha Blackburn, who won with a plurality of 40.32%. Kustoff finished second with 20.24% of the vote and performed the best in the Memphis area, but two other Memphians split that region's vote. During the primary campaign Kustoff said he had an A+ rating from the NRA; in fact, the NRA had never rated him. Kustoff had filled out a questionnaire that the NRA said would have given him an A rating; Kustoff's campaign said that the candidate misspoke when he made his claim.

United States Attorney

In 2006, President Bush nominated Kustoff as U.S. Attorney for the Western District of Tennessee. The U.S. Senate confirmed him. During his tenure in office, Kustoff prosecuted the Operation Tennessee Waltz, after which John Ford, a prominent Tennessee politician, and others were sent to prison. Kustoff also worked to reduce crime in the Memphis area, joining a group of Memphis leaders and law enforcement officials called Operation Safe Community.

Kustoff resigned as U.S. Attorney shortly before the 2008 election and returned to his private practice.

U.S House of Representatives

Elections 
In February 2016, Stephen Fincher announced that he would not run for reelection in Tennessee's 8th congressional district. Kustoff announced his campaign in February; eastern Memphis had been shifted from the 7th to the 8th in the 2010 redistricting. Kustoff began to emerge from the crowded pack when he was endorsed by former Arkansas governor and Republican presidential candidate Mike Huckabee, who filmed ads for Kustoff and campaigned with him. He narrowly won the primary with a plurality of 27.45% of the vote. Shelby County Commissioner George Flinn finished second with 23.08%. Kustoff faced Democratic nominee Rickey Hobson, a Delta Air Lines manager and Somerville, Tennessee resident, in the general election. He visited all 15 counties in the district and urged skeptical Republicans to support Donald Trump for the presidency. Kustoff defeated Hobson in the general election, but had effectively assured himself of a seat in Congress with his primary victory. The addition of the Memphis suburbs had turned the 8th into one of the most Republican districts in the nation; with a Cook Partisan Voting Index of R+15, it was the most Republican district in the state outside East Tennessee.

In 2018 George Flinn ran against Kustoff for the Republican nomination and spent millions on his campaign, but Kustoff won with 56.00% of the vote to Flinn's 39.67%.

Caucus memberships 

 Republican Study Committee

Political positions

Health care
Kustoff voted for the American Health Care Act in May 2017. "[O]ur current health care system is failing Tennesseans", he said. Later that month, a woman angrily confronted him about that vote during a town hall meeting at the University of Tennessee at Martin; after the meeting ended and Kustoff along with some of his staff got into their car, she gave chase and allegedly attempted to run them off the road, then confronted them again about Kustoff's vote, reportedly banging on the windows of his car in the process. Police later arrested her on a felony charge of reckless endangerment.

National security
Kustoff supported Trump's 2017 executive order to impose a temporary ban on entry to the U.S. to citizens of seven Muslim-majority countries, saying, "I believe President Trump is putting American safety first, and I will encourage a long-term plan that is consistent with the values and compassion on which our great nation was founded."

Texas v. Pennsylvania
In December 2020, Kustoff was one of 126 Republican members of the House of Representatives to sign an amicus brief in support of Texas v. Pennsylvania, a lawsuit filed at the United States Supreme Court contesting the results of the 2020 presidential election, in which Joe Biden prevailed over incumbent Donald Trump. The Supreme Court declined to hear the case on the basis that Texas lacked standing under Article III of the Constitution to challenge the results of an election held by another state.

Personal life
Kustoff is Jewish and married to Roberta Kustoff, who is also a lawyer at the Kustoff and Strickland Firm. They have two children. They live in Germantown, an eastern suburb of Memphis.

He and Max Miller are the only two Republican Jewish members of the House of Representatives.

Kustoff served on the board of directors of BankTennessee and as a member of the Tennessee Higher Education Commission.

Electoral history

See also
List of Jewish members of the United States Congress

References

External links
Official U.S. House website
Official campaign website

|-

|-

1966 births
21st-century American politicians
Candidates in the 2002 United States elections
Jewish American attorneys
Jewish members of the United States House of Representatives
Living people
Politicians from Memphis, Tennessee
Republican Party members of the United States House of Representatives from Tennessee
Tennessee lawyers
United States Attorneys for the Western District of Tennessee
University of Memphis alumni
21st-century American Jews
American Jews from Tennessee